The Purple Tape Instrumentals is the third hip hop album produced and released by Evidence. It has 20 songs.

Track listing

Samples 
"Take U Back (Instrumental)"
"Walk Across the World" by Jon English

Evidence (musician) albums
2008 albums